Theodorus Jacob de Jong (born 11 August 1947) is a Dutch former professional footballer and current coach of Nigerian Premier League club Ikorodu United F.C.

During his career, he played for NEC Nijmegen and Feyenoord Rotterdam. He earned 15 caps and scored 3 goals for the Netherlands national team and played for them in the 1974 FIFA World Cup Final.

De Jong was a member of the Feyenoord team that won the UEFA Cup in 1974, beating Tottenham Hotspur in the then two-legged final. He later played three seasons in Hong Kong for Seiko.

His son, Dave de Jong, is also a footballer.

References

External links 

1947 births
Living people
Dutch footballers
Dutch expatriate footballers
Netherlands international footballers
Dutch football managers
Dutch expatriate football managers
Eredivisie players
Go Ahead Eagles managers
1974 FIFA World Cup players
NEC Nijmegen players
Feyenoord players
Roda JC Kerkrade players
Seiko SA players
FC Den Bosch players
Hong Kong First Division League players
Expatriate footballers in Hong Kong
Dutch expatriate sportspeople in Hong Kong
Expatriate football managers in Iran
Dutch expatriate sportspeople in Iran
Expatriate football managers in Nigeria
Dutch expatriate sportspeople in Nigeria
FC Den Bosch managers
PEC Zwolle managers
SC Cambuur managers
Footballers from Leeuwarden
Persepolis F.C. non-playing staff
Willem II (football club) managers
Blauw-Wit Amsterdam players
UEFA Cup winning players
Association football midfielders
Willem II (football club) non-playing staff